Donald Holroyde Hey FRS (12 September 1904 – 21 January 1987) was a Welsh organic chemist. He was notable for his paper proposing that the decomposition of benzoyl peroxide gave rise to free phenyl radicals.

A photographic portrait of him is in the National Portrait Gallery, London.

References

1904 births
1987 deaths
Scientists from Swansea
Organic chemists
Welsh chemists
Fellows of the Royal Society